The LG L9 is a SoC for Smart TV devices made by LG Corp. Specifically, it will be paired with the Google TV platform. It includes a dual-core ARM architecture CPU and a quad-core GPU. 

LG also produces a phone called the LG Optimus L9, this is not related to this SoC.

Specs
 Dual core 1 GHz ARM Cortex-A9 MPCore
 Quad core ARM Mali-400MP

References

Streaming television